5USA is a British free-to-air television channel owned by Channel 5 Broadcasting Limited , a wholly-owned subsidiary of Paramount Global, which is grouped under Paramount Networks UK & Australia division. It was launched on 16 October 2006 as Five US and was the second digital terrestrial television channel in the UK to be launched by RTL Group (the owner at the time) as part of their multi-channel strategy, the first being Five Life (now 5Star). 5USA concentrates on showing imported movies and programmes from the United States.

History
The channel's original broadcast hours were from 4:00pm to 01:00am, however it extended its hours starting at 12:00pm in June 2007. On 1 November 2015, the channel began broadcasting from 7:00am until 3:00am. The channel changes its programme slots and shows from time to time.

British comedian Russell Kane was the 'face of the channel', presenting short clips between some programmes which acted as space fillers to comply with advertising regulations in the UK (UK regulations allows fewer minutes of advertising than in the US) until 16 February 2009. The music used during the idents until February 2009 were "The Dress Looks Nice on You", "Chicago", "Jacksonville" and "The Man of Metropolis Steals Our Hearts", all performed by Sufjan Stevens.

On 28 August 2007, Five US launched a timeshift channel – Five US +1 – available only on Sky. On 22 January 2009, it was announced that Five US would be rebranded  Five USA on 16 February.  It became 5USA in March 2011 as part of a corporate rebranding.

Ratings
The channel's highest ratings to date were on 12 February 2008 for the second part of the CSI: Crime Scene Investigation and Without a Trace crossover. The show averaged 2.580 million viewers between 10:00pm and 11:00pm equating to a multichannel share of 13.9%. Those numbers made the show the most-watched multichannel programme in its slot – beating every other channel (digital and analogue) aside from BBC One, and is currently one of the highest ratings for a multichannel in the United Kingdom.

Current programming

First–run
Taken (2018–present)
Training Day (2018)
The Detail (2018)
The Enemy Within (2020–present)

Second–run

NCIS (2007–present)
The Mentalist (2009–present)
Major Crimes (2013–present)
Longmire (2013–present)
Castle (2014–present)
NCIS: Los Angeles (2014–present)
Law & Order: Special Victims Unit (2014–present)
Gotham (2014–present)
NCIS: New Orleans (2015–present)
Rookie Blue (2015–present)
Chicago Fire (2016–present)
Criminal Minds: Suspect Behavior (2016)
Law & Order: LA (2017–present)
Bull (2017–present)
Grimm (2018)
Criminal Minds: Beyond Borders (2018–present)
Perception (2019–present)
Gone (2019–present)
Ransom (2019–present)
Private Eyes (2019–present)
Hannibal (2019–present)

Repeats
Series that on/off repeat older episodes on the channel.

Columbo – Complete Series (also shown on ITV4)
Law & Order – Series 4–20
Law & Order: Special Victims Unit – Series 1–22
Law & Order: Criminal Intent – Series 1–10
Major Crimes – Series 1–6
NCIS – Series 1–12
NCIS: Los Angeles – Series 1–5
NCIS: New Orleans – Series 1–3

Former programming

Former logos

Notes
 Series nine through fourteen were aired first-run on Channel 5. From the eighteenth series, 5USA obtained the first-run rights to the series. 
 Series one through three and the first two episodes of the fourth series were aired first-run on 5Star. From the third episode of series four, 5USA obtained the first-run rights to the series.
 Universal Channel has first-run rights to Law & Order: Special Victims Unit in the United Kingdom, as of 2014. Universal Channel is currently airing the sixteenth series. Channel 5 had second-run rights to all series, up until the twelfth series. From the thirteenth series, aired in 2015, 5USA has second-run rights to the series. Universal Channel UK closed down on January 27, 2020 and their programming was moved to Sky Witness.
 5USA has finished airing episodes to this first-run or second-run series and is currently rerunning episodes in their schedules, as of 2015.

References

External links
 5USA on Channel 5

Channel 5 (British TV channel)
English-language television stations in the United Kingdom
Television channels and stations established in 2006
Television channels in the United Kingdom
Paramount International Networks
2006 establishments in the United Kingdom